A leadership election was held by the Pan-Malaysian Islamic Party (PAS) on 4 June 2015. It was won by incumbent President of PAS, Abdul Hadi Awang.

Timeline
 1 March 2015 –  Nominations open
 30 April 2015 – Nominations close
 4 June 2015 – Ballots of delegates
 4 June 2015 – Results announced

Central Working Committee election results
[ Source]

Permanent Chairman

Deputy Permanent Chairman

Auditor

President

Deputy President

Vice Presidents

Central Working Committee Members

References

2015 elections in Malaysia
Pan-Malaysian Islamic Party leadership election
Malaysian Islamic Party leadership elections